The Libya Observer is an English and Arabic online newspaper based in Tripoli, Libya, created in 2015.

History
The Libya Observer claims to have evolved from online social media news articles, first published in April 2014, into a more conventional online newspaper in July 2015. The chief editor is Abdullah Ibrahim.

Influence
Freedom House used articles by Libya Observer as a major source of information on Libyan Internet freedom in 2018.

See also
 List of newspapers in Libya

References

2015 establishments in Libya
Publications established in 2015
Newspapers published in Libya
Mass media in Tripoli, Libya
Arabic-language newspapers
African news websites